Alexandria is a town in Grafton County, New Hampshire, United States. The population was 1,776 at the 2020 census, up from 1,613 at the 2010 census. Newfound Lake is in the northeast corner, with Wellington State Park on the western shore. The town is home to Welton Falls State Forest. Cardigan Mountain State Park, with Mount Cardigan, is in the west. Another attraction is Mowglis Mountain, named for Rudyard Kipling's Jungle Book hero.

History

Granted in 1753 by the Masonian Proprietors, the town was named for Alexandria, Virginia, location of a 1755 conference of governors early in the French and Indian War. Alexandria was granted to Joseph Butterfield and others, March 13, 1757. First settled in 1769 by John Moore Corliss and his brother Jonathan, it was incorporated by the New Hampshire General Court on November 23, 1782. Danbury was set off and incorporated in 1795.

Although farmers found parts of the terrain mountainous, other parts were level intervales suited for cultivation. By 1859, when the population was 1,273, agriculture was a chief occupation. The town also had a carriage maker, nine sawmills and three gristmills.

Alexandria was the birthplace of Luther C. Ladd (1843–1861), the first enlisted soldier to lose his life in the Civil War, shot during the Baltimore Riot. Today, the town is home to Cardigan Lodge, the Appalachian Mountain Club facility at the base of Mount Cardigan.

Geography

Alexandria is drained by the Fowler River, an east-flowing tributary of Newfound Lake. The Smith River forms part of the southern border of the town. All water bodies in the town eventually flow to the Pemigewasset River, part of the Merrimack River watershed. Mount Cardigan, elevation , is on the western boundary of the town. The summit is in the town of Orange, while the highest point in Alexandria is on the Firescrew ridge to the north, where the elevation reaches .

Demographics

As of the census of 2000, there were 1,329 people, 504 households, and 386 families residing in the town.  The population density was 30.9 people per square mile (11.9/km).  There were 783 housing units at an average density of 18.2 per square mile (7.0/km).  The racial makeup of the town was 97.82% White, 0.08% African American, 0.30% Native American, 0.38% Asian, and 1.43% from two or more races. Hispanic or Latino of any race were 0.23% of the population.

There were 504 households, out of which 31.5% had children under the age of 18 living with them, 64.7% were married couples living together, 7.5% had a female householder with no husband present, and 23.4% were non-families. 16.9% of all households were made up of individuals, and 6.0% had someone living alone who was 65 years of age or older.  The average household size was 2.64 and the average family size was 2.94.

In the town, the population was spread out, with 25.0% under the age of 18, 4.7% from 18 to 24, 31.0% from 25 to 44, 28.0% from 45 to 64, and 11.3% who were 65 years of age or older.  The median age was 40 years. For every 100 females, there were 99.3 males.  For every 100 females age 18 and over, there were 99.8 males.

The median income for a household in the town was $42,667, and the median income for a family was $45,938. Males had a median income of $31,367 versus $25,163 for females. The per capita income for the town was $19,323.  About 4.7% of families and 6.3% of the population were below the poverty line, including 9.0% of those under age 18 and none of those age 65 or over.

Education
Alexandria is within the Newfound Area School District. The district's secondary schools are Newfound Memorial Middle School, and Newfound Regional High School in Bristol.

References

External links
 
 Haynes Library
 New Hampshire Economic and Labor Market Information Bureau Profile

Towns in Grafton County, New Hampshire
Populated places established in 1782
Towns in New Hampshire
1782 establishments in New Hampshire